Craspidospermum is a monotypic genus of plant in the family Apocynaceae endemic to Madagascar.  the World Checklist of Selected Plant Families recognises the single species Craspidospermum verticillatum (Malagasy: Vandrika).

Description
Its flowers feature a white or pale pink corolla, with pink or dark red throat.

Range and habitat
Craspidospermum verticillatum ranges across the east, southeast, and center of Madagascar. Its natural habitat is humid and subhumid lowland rainforest and montane forest, and sometimes rocky areas, from sea-level to  elevation.

The tree is widespread in the island's humid and subhumid forests. It is threatened with habitat loss from deforestation for timber, firewood, and to clear land for agriculture and mining, and its population is declining.

Uses
Local medicinal uses include as a treatment for pulmonary diseases and syphilis. C. verticillatum is endemic to Madagascar.

References

Rauvolfioideae
Endemic flora of Madagascar
Flora of the Madagascar lowland forests
Flora of the Madagascar subhumid forests
Monotypic Apocynaceae genera
Plants used in traditional African medicine
Taxa named by Wenceslas Bojer
Taxa named by Alphonse Pyramus de Candolle